These are the official results of the Women's 10 km walk event at the 1986 European Championships in Stuttgart, West Germany, held on August 26, 1986.

Medalists

Abbreviations
All times shown are in hours:minutes:seconds

Records

Final ranking

Participation
According to an unofficial count, 24 athletes from 12 countries participated in the event.

 (1)
 (2)
 (1)
 (2)
 (1)
 (2)
 (3)
 (3)
 (2)
 (3)
 (3)
 (1)

See also
 1987 Women's World Championships 10km Walk (Rome)
 1991 Women's World Championships 10km Walk (Tokyo)
 1992 Women's Olympic 10km Walk (Barcelona)

References

External links
 Results
 Results

Walk 10 km
Racewalking at the European Athletics Championships
1986 in women's athletics